Gratiot may refer to:

Places
Gratiot, Ohio, a village
Gratiot (town), Wisconsin, a town
Gratiot, Wisconsin, a village
Gratiot County, Michigan
Gratiot Community Airport
Gratiot River, Michigan
Lake Gratiot, Michigan

Other uses
Gratiot (surname)
M-3 (Michigan highway), known for most of its length as Gratiot Avenue

See also
Fort Gratiot Township, Michigan
Fort Gratiot Light, a lighthouse in Michigan
Dunkirk Light, also known as Point Gratiot Light, a lighthouse on Lake Erie in New York State
Gratiot Street Prison, an American Civil War prison in St. Louis, Missouri
Gratiot's Grove (Wisconsin), a frontier mining settlement and fort
Gratiot House, a house in Wisconsin